Bojan Radović (born ) is a Montenegrin volleyball player. He is part of the Montenegro men's national volleyball team. On club level he plays for Budućnost Podgorica.

References

External links
 profile at FIVB.org

1992 births
Living people
Montenegrin men's volleyball players
Place of birth missing (living people)